William Harry Jellema (1893–1982) was the founder of Calvin College's philosophy department. He taught at Calvin College from 1920 to 1936, transferred to Indiana University and then returned to Calvin from 1948 to 1963. Following his mandatory retirement from Calvin College, Jellema taught for a year at Haverford College and was invited by James Zumberge to found the philosophy department at Grand Valley State College in Allendale, Michigan, and continue his teaching for another five years.

Three of his students from Calvin were elected President of the American Philosophical Association, and two of his students delivered the Gifford Lectures. Alvin Plantinga described Jellema as "by all odds ... the most gifted teacher of philosophy I have ever encountered" and "obviously in dead earnest about Christianity; he was also a magnificently thoughtful and reflective Christian."

The Jellema Lectures at Calvin College are named in his honor. Past Jellema lecturers have included JR Lucas (1987), Richard Swinburne (1988), Marilyn McCord Adams (1992), Sarah Coakley (2001), and Nancey Murphy (2009).  There is also a study room in Calvin College's Hiemenga Hall named the Jellema Room, which contains Jellema's library.

References

1893 births
1982 deaths
American Christians
Calvin University faculty
Christian philosophers
20th-century American philosophers